Sheldon v. Metro-Goldwyn Pictures Corp., 309 U.S. 390 (1940), was a United States Supreme Court case in which the Court held, in the case of an unauthorized adaptation, courts may elect to award only a portion of an infringer's profits to the plaintiff. The proportion that the defendant is entitled to keep is in proportion to the amount of original creative work that went into the adaptation, and the court may be assisted in determining that by expert witness testimony. The Court found that awarding more to the plaintiff "would be to inflict an unauthorized penalty."

The case involved Metro-Goldwyn using material from the 1930 play Dishonored Lady by Edward Sheldon and Margaret Ayer Barnes for the 1932 film Letty Lynton. It was brought before various courts before ending up with the Supreme Court, which awarded one fifth of the profits.

References

External links
 

1940 in United States case law
United States copyright case law
United States Supreme Court cases
United States Supreme Court cases of the Hughes Court